G.I. Joe: A Real American Hero is a comic book series written by Larry Hama and published by IDW Publishing. Based on the G.I. Joe franchise by Donald Levine and Hasbro, the comic book is set in the original continuity by Marvel Comics and ignores the previous continuity by Devil's Due Publishing. Because of this, the numbering of the issues started where the Marvel Comics run left at #156, with a special issue #155 1/2 given out for free.

The series debuted in May 2010 and concluded in November 2022 with issue #300, following the announcement of the G.I. Joe comic book license leaving IDW by the end of the year.

List of titles

Main 
 G.I. Joe: A Real American Hero (#155 1/2–300, 3 specials)
 G.I. Joe: A Real American Hero — Silent Option (#1–4)
 G.I. Joe: A Real American Hero — Yearbook 2019
G.I. Joe: A Real American Hero — Yearbook 2021 (#1–4)

Other 
 G.I. Joe: A Real American Hero vs. The Six Million Dollar Man (#1–4, with Dynamite Entertainment)
G.I. Joe: A Real American Hero — Complete Silence
G.I. Joe: A Real American Hero — Serpentor Uncoiled
G.I. Joe: A Real American Hero —Yo Joe!
G.I. Joe: A Real American Hero — Cobraaaa!
G.I. Joe: A Real American Hero — Saturday Morning Adventures (#1–4)
G.I. Joe: A Real American Hero — Best of Snake Eyes
G.I. Joe: A Real American Hero — Rise Of Serpentor
G.I. Joe: A Real American Hero — Best of Storm Shadow

Collected editions 
The series has been collected in a number of trade paperbacks:
 Volume 1 (collects G.I. Joe: A Real American Hero #155 1/2, 156-160, February 2011)
 Volume 2 (collects G.I. Joe: A Real American Hero #161-165, 132 pages, July 2011)
 Volume 3 (collects G.I. Joe: A Real American Hero #166-170, 124 pages, December 2011)
 Volume 4 (collects G.I. Joe: A Real American Hero #171-175, 128 pages, June 2012)
 Volume 5 (collects G.I. Joe: A Real American Hero #176-180, 124 pages, October 2012)
 Volume 6 (collects G.I. Joe: A Real American Hero #181-185, 128 pages, April 2, 2013)
 Volume 7 (collects G.I. Joe: A Real American Hero #186-190, 128 pages, July 30, 2013)
 Volume 8 (collects G.I. Joe: A Real American Hero #191-195, 124 pages, Dec 17, 2013)
 Volume 9 (collects G.I. Joe: A Real American Hero #196-200, 132 pages, May 20, 2014)
 Volume 10 (collects G.I. Joe: A Real American Hero #201-205, 124 pages, November 25, 2014)
 Volume 11 (collects G.I. Joe: A Real American Hero #206-210, 124 pages, April 14, 2015 )
 Volume 12 (collects G.I. Joe: A Real American Hero #211-215, 124 pages, September 29, 2015 )
 Volume 13 (collects G.I. Joe: A Real American Hero #216–218 and the 2012 Annual, 116 pages, December 22, 2015)
 Volume 14 (collects G.I. Joe: A Real American Hero issues #219–221 & the prelude issue #0, 100 pages, March 29, 2016)
 Volume 15 (collects G.I. Joe: A Real American Hero #222–225, 100 pages, June 14, 2016)
 Volume 16 (collects G.I. Joe: A Real American Hero #226–230, 120 pages, October 18, 2016)
 Volume 17 (collects G.I. Joe: A Real American Hero #231–235, 120 pages, May 10, 2017)
 Volume 18 (collects G.I. Joe: A Real American Hero #236–240, 120 pages, September 12, 2017)
 Volume 19 (collects G.I. Joe: A Real American Hero #241–245, 120 pages, February 13, 2018)
 Volume 20 (collects G.I. Joe: A Real American Hero #246–250, 128 pages, June 26, 2018)
 Volume 21 (collects G.I. Joe: A Real American Hero #251–255, 128 pages, December 11, 2018)
 Volume 22 (collects G.I. Joe: A Real American Hero #256–260, 120 pages, May 14, 2019)
 Volume 23 (collects G.I. Joe: A Real American Hero #261–265, 120 pages, October 22, 2019)
Volume 24 (collects G.I. Joe: A Real American Hero #266–275, 248 pages, February 16, 2021)
Volume 25 (collects G.I. Joe: A Real American Hero #276–285, 240 pages, December 14, 2021)

A separate set of paperbacks collects these issues in larger volumes following the Classic G.I. Joe Marvel reprints listed in the previous section:
 Volume 16 (collects G.I. Joe: A Real American Hero #155 1/2-165, 268 pages, May 2015, ISBN )
 Volume 17 (collects G.I. Joe: A Real American Hero #166-175, 245 pages, January 2016, ISBN )
 Volume 18 (collects G.I. Joe: A Real American Hero #176-185, 246 pages, July 2016, ISBN )
 Volume 19 (collects G.I. Joe: A Real American Hero #186-195, 244 pages, March 2017, ISBN )
 Volume 20 (collects G.I. Joe: A Real American Hero #196-205, 244 pages, October 2017, ISBN )

See also 
 G.I. Joe (IDW Publishing)
G.I. Joe: Cobra
 G.I. Joe (2019 comic book)
Snake Eyes: Deadgame

References 

IDW Publishing titles
Comic book reboots
G.I. Joe comics